The 1964–65 season was Mansfield Town's 28th season in the Football League and 4th in the Third Division, they finished in 3rd position with 59 points, missing out on promotion on goal average to Bristol City.

Final league table

Results

Football League Third Division

FA Cup

League Cup

Squad statistics
 Squad list sourced from

References
General
 Mansfield Town 1964–65 at soccerbase.com (use drop down list to select relevant season)

Specific

Mansfield Town F.C. seasons
Mansfield Town